Abacetus michaelseni is a species of ground beetle in the subfamily Pterostichinae. It was described by Kuntzen in 1919.

References

michaelseni
Beetles described in 1919